This is a list of sovereign states in the 1980s, giving an overview of states around the world during the period between 1 January 1980 and 31 December 1989. It contains 188 entries, arranged alphabetically, with information on the status and recognition of their sovereignty. It includes 171 widely-recognized sovereign states, 2 constituent republics of another sovereign state that were UN members on their own right, 2 associated states, and 13 entities which claim an effective sovereignty but are considered de facto dependencies of other powers by the general international community.

Sovereign states

Other entities
Excluded from the list above are the following noteworthy entities which either were not fully sovereign or did not claim to be independent:
 Antarctica as a whole had no government and no permanent population. Seven states claimed portions of Antarctica and five of these had reciprocally recognised one another's claims. These claims, which were regulated by the Antarctic Treaty System, were neither recognised nor disputed by any other signatory state.
  was occupied and administered by Indonesia as Timor Timur, but this was not recognized by the United Nations, which considered it to be Portuguese territory under Indonesian occupation.
  was effectively a part of the Soviet Union, but the legality of the annexation was not widely-recognized. The Baltic diplomatic services in the West continued to be recognised as representing the de jure state.
  The Federal Republic of Mindanao was a short-lived, self-proclaimed, unrecognized breakaway state encompassing Mindanao, Palawan and the Sulu Archipelago of the Philippines. The independence of the republic was to be proclaimed at a convention in Cagayan de Oro on April 25, 1986 by the Mindanao People's Democratic Movement led by Reuben Canoy but original plans to proclaim the proposed republic's independence were changed to avert arrest by the Corazon Aquino administration due to violation against sedition law.
  was effectively a part of the Soviet Union, but the legality of the annexation was not widely-recognized. The Baltic diplomatic services in the West continued to be recognised as representing the de jure state.
  was incorporated into the Soviet Union in 1940, but the legality of the annexation was not widely-recognized. The Baltic diplomatic services in the West continued to be recognised as representing the de jure state.
 The Saudi Arabian–Iraqi neutral zone was a strip of neutral territory between Iraq and Saudi Arabia (to 26 December 1981).
  The Sovereign Military Order of Malta was an entity claiming sovereignty. The order had bi-lateral diplomatic relations with a large number of states, but had no territory other than extraterritorial areas within Rome. The order's Constitution stated: "The Order is a subject of international law and exercises sovereign functions." Although the order frequently asserted its sovereignty, it did not claim to be a sovereign state. It lacked a defined territory. Since all its members were citizens of other states, almost all of them lived in their native countries, and those who resided in the order's extraterritorial properties in Rome did so only in connection with their official duties, the order lacked the characteristic of having a permanent population.
  West Berlin was a political enclave that was closely aligned with – but not actually a part of – West Germany. It consisted of three occupied sectors administered by the United States, the United Kingdom, and France.

See also
List of sovereign states
List of sovereign states by year
List of state leaders in 1980
List of state leaders in 1981
List of state leaders in 1982
List of state leaders in 1983
List of state leaders in 1984
List of state leaders in 1985
List of state leaders in 1986
List of state leaders in 1987
List of state leaders in 1988
List of state leaders in 1989

Notes

References

1980-1989
Sovereign states
1980 in international relations
1981 in international relations
1982 in international relations
1983 in international relations
1984 in international relations
1985 in international relations
1986 in international relations
1987 in international relations
1988 in international relations
1989 in international relations